In enzymology, an ureidoglycolate dehydrogenase is an enzyme that catalyzes the chemical reaction

(S)-ureidoglycolate + NAD(P)+  oxalurate + NAD(P)H + H+

The 3 substrates of this enzyme are (S)-ureidoglycolate, NAD+, and NADP+, whereas its 4 products are oxalurate, NADH, NADPH, and H+.

This enzyme belongs to the family of oxidoreductases, specifically those acting on the CH-OH group of donor with NAD+ or NADP+ as acceptor. The systematic name of this enzyme class is (S)-ureidoglycolate:NAD(P)+ oxidoreductase. This enzyme participates in purine metabolism.

Structural studies

References

 

EC 1.1.1
NADPH-dependent enzymes
NADH-dependent enzymes
Enzymes of known structure